Barahona is a province of the Dominican Republic. The Barahona Coast is located on the southwestern part of the Dominican Republic approximately three hours drive from Santo Domingo the capital of the Dominican Republic. In 2019, volunteers from Amigos de las Americas visited to facilitate projects within the various municipalities of Barahona.

Municipalities and municipal districts

The province as of June 20, 2006 is divided into the following  municipalities (municipios) and municipal districts (distrito municipal - D.M.) within them:
Cabral
El Peñón
Enriquillo
Arroyo Dulce (D.M.)
Fundación
Pescadería (D.M.)
Jaquimeyes
Palo Alto (D.M.)
La Ciénaga
Bahoruco (D.M.)
Las Salinas
Paraíso
Los Patos (D.M.)
Polo
Santa Cruz de Barahona 
El Cachón (D.M.)
La Guázara (D.M.)
Vicente Noble
Canoa (D.M.)
Fondo Negro (D.M.)
Quita Coraza (D.M.)

The following is a sortable table of the municipalities and municipal districts with population figures as of the 2014 estimate. Urban population are those living in the seats (cabeceras literally heads) of municipalities or of municipal districts. Rural population are those living in the districts (Secciones literally sections) and neighborhoods (Parajes literally places) outside them. The population figures are from the 2014 population estimate.

For comparison with the municipalities and municipal districts of other provinces see the list of municipalities and municipal districts of the Dominican Republic.

References

External links

  Information on the Barahona province and the Southwest region of the Dominican Republic
  Oficina Nacional de Estadística, Statistics Portal of the Dominican Republic
  Oficina Nacional de Estadística, Maps with administrative division of the provinces of the Dominican Republic, downloadable in PDF format

 
Provinces of the Dominican Republic